Claus Gabriel Gold Betig (born August 27, 1990 in Misiones, Argentina) is an Argentine footballer who plays as a centre-back for Argentine Primera Division club Argentinos Juniors.

Gold Betig is notorious for an incident that occurred after he signed a professional contract with Unión de Santa Fe. He was seen wearing Club Atlético Colón (Unión's bitter city rival) clothing in a local shop, and the club's leadership questioned his loyalty. After suffering abuse from Unión's supporters, he requested and was granted a termination of his contract.

Teams
 Unión de Santa Fe 2008–2009
 Everton 2009–2010
 Argentinos Juniors 2010–present

References

External links
 
 

1990 births
Living people
Sportspeople from Misiones Province
Argentine footballers
Association football central defenders
Everton de Viña del Mar footballers
Argentinos Juniors footballers
Unión de Santa Fe footballers
Argentine expatriate footballers
Argentine expatriate sportspeople in Chile
Expatriate footballers in Chile